Kikos may refer to:

Kikos (1931 film), Armenian film
Kikos (1979 film), animated Armenian film

See also
Kiko (disambiguation)